WRC Rally Magazine was a show on Speed Channel. The show always preceded the network's coverage of a World Rally Championship event. It had the latest news and notes from the championship, while previewing the upcoming event. The show debuted in January 2004 just before the Monte Carlo Rally. Ralph Sheheen was the host/narrator. It lasted just one season.

Speed (TV network) original programming
2004 American television series debuts
2004 American television series endings